Freda Charcilia Payne (born September 19, 1942) is an American singer and actress. Payne is best known for her career in music during the mid-1960s through the mid-1980s. Her most notable record is her 1970 hit single "Band of Gold". Payne was also an actress in musicals and film, as well as the host of a TV talk show. Payne is the older sister of Scherrie Payne, a former singer with the American vocal group the Supremes.

Biography

Early life and career
Payne was born in Detroit, Michigan, and grew up listening to jazz singers, such as Ella Fitzgerald and Billie Holiday. As a teenager, she attended the Detroit Institute of Musical Arts; she soon began singing radio commercial jingles, and took part in (and won many) local TV and radio talent shows. In 1963, she moved to New York City and worked with many entertainers, including Quincy Jones, Pearl Bailey, and Bill Cosby. The next year, her debut album, a jazz recording with arranger Manny Albam entitled After the Lights Go Down Low and Much More!!! was released on the Impulse! label. (This album was re-issued on CD in Japan in early 2002, and again in the United States in 2005.) In 1965 she toured Europe for the first time recording an album in Sweden with Don Gardner and Bengt-Arne Wallin. In 1966, she released her second American album, again in the jazz idiom, How Do You Say I Don't Love You Anymore, for MGM Records. She also made occasional guest appearances on television shows including The Merv Griffin Show and The Tonight Show Starring Johnny Carson.

She added theatrical credits to her repertoire: she understudied Leslie Uggams for the Broadway show Hallelujah Baby in 1967, and appeared with the Equity Theatre in a production of Lost in the Stars. In 1969, her old friends back home in Detroit, Brian Holland, Lamont Dozier, and Edward Holland, Jr., persuaded her to sign with their newly formed record label Invictus. During that same year, her first Invictus single, "Unhooked Generation" (a minor R&B hit), was released. Shortly thereafter, Eddie Holland offered her a song entitled "Band of Gold", which he along with Brian Holland and Lamont Dozier co-wrote (under the pen name Edythe Wayne) with Ronald Dunbar. In early 1970, the song became an instant pop smash reaching #3 in the US and #1 in the UK for six consecutive weeks; it also gave Payne her first gold record. Global sales were estimated at two million. An album of the same name proved to be fairly successful as well. Other Invictus singles included "Deeper and Deeper", which reached #24 in the US and #33 in the UK at the end of 1970; "You Brought the Joy", and the Vietnam War protest song "Bring the Boys Home" (U.S. Billboard Hot 100 #12, 1971), her second gold record. Her other Invictus albums were Contact (1971), The Best of Freda Payne (1972, a compilation which included four new, unissued songs), and her last Invictus album Reaching Out (1973).

In 1973, she left Invictus and recorded albums for ABC/Dunhill and Capitol, but she never found the commercial success that she had enjoyed with Invictus. She recorded a duet "I Wanna See You Soon" with Capitol stablemates Tavares. She released three disco albums for Capitol from 1977 to 1979, Stares and Whispers, Supernatural High and Hot. The first one features the disco hit "Love Magnet" produced by Frank Wilson (1977).

In 1981, she briefly hosted her own talk show Today's Black Woman, and also found work acting in different movies, Broadway and other theatre productions throughout the 1980s. Although she was concentrating more on acting by that time, she never gave up music; in 1982, she recorded a single entitled "In Motion" for the Sutra label in New York, and in 1986, she recorded a remake of her old hit "Band of Gold" with Belinda Carlisle. In 1990, she recorded three songs for Ian Levine's UK Motorcity label: another remake of "Band of Gold", "Memories and Souvenirs", and "Only Minutes Away". In the mid-1990s, she released three albums for Dove Music: The (Unauthorized) I Hate Barney Songbook: A Parody (1994), An Evening with Freda Payne: Live in Concert which featured her sister Scherrie Payne on background vocals, and her first (and only) Christmas album Christmas with Freda and Friends, which featured a duet between Freda and Scherrie (both 1996). She also continued her acting career appearing in the films, Private Obsession (1995), Ragdoll (1999) as the character Gran, Nutty Professor II: The Klumps (2000), and Fire & Ice (made-for-TV, 2001).

Later career
In early 2001, Payne released a new album entitled Come See About Me for the Volt Records label (the title track is a remake of the Supremes' hit). In early 2003, she performed in a show called Love & Payne, with Darlene Love at Feinstein's at the Regency in New York, and at the Cinegrill in the Hollywood Roosevelt Hotel in Los Angeles, getting excellent reviews. 

During the early 2000s, the following compilation albums of her music were released: Lost in Love (which includes nine of her post-Invictus recordings), Band of Gold: The Best of Freda Payne (both 2000), Unhooked Generation: The Complete Invictus Recordings (2001), and The Best of Freda Payne: Ten Best Series (2002). In late 2002, Payne appeared with many R&B stars on the "Rhythm, Love, and Soul" edition of the PBS series American Soundtrack. Her performance of "Band of Gold" was included on the accompanying live album that was released in 2004. On April 22, 2009, Payne appeared on American Idol and sang "Band of Gold". 

In February 2010, Payne joined Kanye West, Jordin Sparks, Jennifer Hudson, Barbra Streisand and many more on We Are the World for Haiti Relief. In 2011, Payne recorded a duet, "Saving A Life", with British pop star Sir Cliff Richard for inclusion on his Soulicious album. She joined Richard on his "Soulicious" tour of the UK in October of the same year. She sang the new duet with Richard along with her own hit "Band of Gold".

In January 2018, she performed "A Tribute to Ella Fitzgerald", in the Sitnik Theatre of the Lackland Performing Arts Center, in Hackettstown, New Jersey.

Personal life and honors
Payne was married to American singer Gregory Abbott from 1976 until 1979. Payne and Abbott had a son, Gregory Abbott, Jr., who was born on September 19, 1977, Payne's 35th birthday. Payne later had a relationship with American musician Edmund Sylvers (lead singer of the Sylvers) from 1979 until January 1983. Sylvers wrote and produced her 1982 single "In Motion". 

In 1974, she made the cover of Jet magazine after she was 
appointed a Dame of Justice of the Order of St John of Jerusalem by the Prince of Rumania.

In 2017, Payne was inducted into the 2017 class of the Rhythm and Blues Music Hall of Fame, in her hometown of Detroit.

Discography

Studio albums

Live albums
 1965: Freda Payne in Stockholm' with Don Gardner Quintet with Dee Dee Ford and Jimmy Ricks (Swedish release 1965, USA release 1971)
 1996: An Evening with Freda Payne: Live in Concert
 1999: Live in Concert

Compilations albums

Singles

As a lead artist

As a featured artist

Filmography

Concerts
 2006: Flashbacks: Soul Sensation – Compilation
 2009: Freda Payne: High Standards with Stanley Turrentine and Jerome Richardson
 2009: Live in Concert with The Stylistics

As an actress
 1973: Book of Numbers
 1997: Sprung
 1999: Ragdoll
 2000: Nutty Professor II: The Klumps
 2001: Deadly Rhapsody
 2007: Cordially Invited
 2014: Ella: First Lady of Song
 2014: The Divorce
 2017: Kinky

See also
List of soul musicians
List of disco artists (F–K)
List of people from Detroit
List of acts who appeared on American Bandstand
List of people who appeared on Soul Train
List of performers on Top of the Pops

Notes
Biography

Discography

References

External links

Freda Payne biodata, mackavenue.com. Accessed April 3, 2022.

1942 births
Living people
African-American women singers
American women pop singers
American soul singers
Dames of Justice of the Order of St John
Actresses from Detroit
Northern soul musicians
Impulse! Records artists
MGM Records artists
Dunhill Records artists
Capitol Records artists
American film actresses
African-American television talk show hosts
American television talk show hosts
American women television personalities
20th-century American actresses
21st-century American actresses
African-American actresses
Singers from Detroit
20th-century American women singers
21st-century American women singers
20th-century American singers
21st-century American singers